David Rubinson (born August 7, 1942 in Brooklyn, New York) is an American recording engineer and music producer, who was particularly involved in music production from the 1960s to the 1980s.  He produced such diverse acts as Moby Grape, Herbie Hancock, the Pointer Sisters, Santana, and Taj Mahal. Rubinson also founded The Automatt Recording Studios and was the music producer for the film Apocalypse Now.

History

David Rubinson was graduated from Columbia University in 1963 with a bachelor's degree in English.  He commenced his record production career shortly thereafter, becoming an associate producer at Capitol Records during 1963-1964. Thereafter, he became a staff producer for Columbia Records, a position he held from 1964 to 1969. Rubinson then went into partnership with Bill Graham, working with the latter in the Fillmore Corporation, and creating two record labels with him:  San Francisco Records and Fillmore Records. In 1976, he built The Automatt, the first automated recording studio in San Francisco.

After suffering a severe heart attack, Rubinson retired from record production in 1982, thereafter devoting his time to artist management (Narada Michael Walden, Ryuichi Sakamoto, Marcel Marceau, Wayne Shorter) and film. He was the executive producer of Sugihara: Conspiracy of Kindness, a PBS biography of Japanese diplomat Chiune Sugihara, who facilitated the escape of thousands of Jews from Lithuania during World War II.  The film won the award for Best Documentary at the 2000 Hollywood Film Festival and the 2001 Pare Lorentz Award, sponsored by the International Documentary Association.

In 2009, Rubinson relocated to France to practice permaculture and sustainable, renewable food production and became a public opponent of the actions of Israel in Gaza.

Selected discography

References

Record producers from New York (state)
American audio engineers
1942 births
People from Brooklyn
Columbia College (New York) alumni
Living people
Engineers from New York City